Domangbeu is a town in western Ivory Coast. It is a sub-prefecture of Zoukougbeu Department in Haut-Sassandra Region, Sassandra-Marahoué District.

Domangbeu was a commune until March 2012, when it became one of 1126 communes nationwide that were abolished.

In 2014, the population of the sub-prefecture of Domangbeu was 9,530.

Villages
The 5 villages of the sub-prefecture of Domangbeu and their population in 2014 are:
 Bahibli (513)
 Didibobli (557)
 Domangbeu (3 390)
 Gbelibli (1 539)
 Litobli (3 531)

Notes

Sub-prefectures of Haut-Sassandra
Former communes of Ivory Coast